The Huansu H3 is a 7-seat MPV produced by Huansu, a brand of the Chonqing Bisu Automotive Corporation, which is closely related to Beiqi-Yinxiang, a joint venture between Beijing Auto (Beiqi) and the Yinxiang Group.

Overview

The Huansu H3 was officially launched during the 2015 Chengdu Auto Show in China, with prices ranging from 55,800 to 67,800 yuan at launch. The only engine at launch is a 1.5 liter engine with 113hp and 150nm, mated to a five-speed manual gearbox with front-wheel-drive being the only powertrain option. A 1.8 liter engine with 140hp and 180nm mated to a 5-speed manual gearbox or a 5-speed automatic gearbox was added to the line-up later. 

The Huansu H3 platform also underpins the later revealed Bisu M3.

Huansu H3F

The Huansu H3F was officially launched in June 2016 with a price ranging from 58,800 yuan to 67,800 yuan. As the more upmarket trim of the Huansu H3, the Huansu H3F features the same 2-2-3 seating configuration and 1.5 liter engine powertrain while sporting a restyled front and rear end design. The only engine at launch is a 1.5 liter naturally aspirated engine with 114hp and 150N·m mated to a 5-speed manual gearbox.

References

External links 

 Official Website

Cars introduced in 2015
Minivans
Front-wheel-drive vehicles
Cars of China